US Post Office and Federal Courthouse-Colorado Springs Main, also known as the Colorado Springs Post Office and Federal Courthouse, is a historic federal building that serves as a post office and courthouse. It is located at 210 East Pikes Peak Avenue in Colorado Springs, Colorado. The Renaissance Revival - Beaux-Arts style building is listed on the  National Register of Historic Places. and is on the Colorado State Register of Historic Properties.

Overview
The land for the property was donated by Winfield Scott Stratton. Designed by James Knox Taylor the building was constructed between 1908 and 1910. Taylor, Supervising Architect of the Department of the Treasury, oversaw the design of 30 federal buildings. It was the city's first federal building. It is made of granite and is a Beaux-Arts design of an Italian Renaissance Revival.

See also 
List of United States post offices

References

External links 
 United States Post Office - Colorado Springs Main
 United States Post Office - Colorado Springs Main

Post office buildings on the National Register of Historic Places in Colorado
Colorado State Register of Historic Properties
Buildings and structures in Colorado Springs, Colorado
Courthouses on the National Register of Historic Places in Colorado
Federal buildings in the United States
National Register of Historic Places in Colorado Springs, Colorado